Johnston Building may refer to:
Johnston Building (Baltimore, Maryland), listed on the NRHP
 Johnston Building (Charlotte, North Carolina)